Jahmal Williams is a regular-footed professional skateboarder, skate company owner, and artist from Boston, Massachusetts.

Early life and education 
Williams was raised by his mother in Boston, Massachusetts with four other siblings. As a young kid in the early-to-mid 1980s, Williams was into breakdancing and graffiti writing. In an effort to stay out of trouble, Williams got into freestyle BMX biking. He brought his bike to the local skatepark and had it stolen. This lead Williams to buy a skateboard in the summer of 1988. His mother bought him a Thrasher magazine issue with Tony Alva on the cover, further encouraging his interest in skating.

In 1998, Williams received a scholarship to attend the School of the Museum of Fine Arts in Boston. There he studied drawing, sculpture, and painting for four years.

Skateboarding 
Williams first sponsor was Beacon Hill Skateshop. T.V. skateboards came to Whitmen, Massachusetts on a tour. Williams befriended the team and ended up going on tour with them. T.V. team was Mike Vallely, Ed Templeton, Steve Berra, Ethan Fowler, Jerry Fowler, and Williams. Williams went pro for T.V.

After T.V. folded Williams joined Ed Templeton's new company, Toy Machine. After riding for Toy Machine for a number of years, Mike Vallely connected Williams to Powell. Williams rode for Powell for a number of years until he parted ways with the company.

Hopps Skateboards 
In 2007, Williams founded Hopps Skateboards.

References

External links 
 HOPPS SKATEBOARDS
Chrome Ball Interview
Five Favorite Parts with Jahmal Williams - Quartersnacks

American skateboarders
Living people
African-American skateboarders
School of the Museum of Fine Arts at Tufts alumni
People from Boston
Artist skateboarders
Year of birth missing (living people)
African-American businesspeople
21st-century African-American people